Gongora arcuata is a species of orchid found in Colombia.

References

External links 
 
 

arcuata
Orchids of Colombia